The Rural Municipality of Wreford No. 280 is a rural municipality (RM) in the Canadian province of Saskatchewan within Census Division No. 11 and  Division No. 5. Located in the south-central portion of the province, it is north of the city of Regina.

History 
The RM of Wreford No. 280 incorporated as a rural municipality on December 12, 1910.

Geography

Communities and localities 
The following urban municipalities are surrounded by the RM.

Towns
Nokomis

The following unincorporated communities are within the RM.

Localities
 Ambassador
 Hatfield
 Undora
 Venn

Demographics 

Government 
The RM of Wreford No. 280 is governed by an elected municipal council and an appointed administrator that meets on the second Tuesday of every month. The reeve of the RM is Dean Hobman while its administrator is Melanie Rich. The RM's office is located in Nokomis.

Transportation

See also 
List of rural municipalities in Saskatchewan

References 

Wreford
Division No. 11, Saskatchewan